Paranormal Xperience 3D is a 2011 slasher horror film, directed by Sergi Vizcaíno, written by Daniel Padró and produced by Mercedes Gamero, Joaquín Padró and Mar Targarona. It was the first Spanish horror film to be shot in 3-D.

It stars Óscar Sinela, Úrsula Corberó, Alba Ribas, Amaia Salamanca, Maxi Iglesias and Luis Fernández "Perla".

The film was produced by Rodar y Rodar and Antena 3 Films.

Plot 
Ángela, a psychiatry student who is skeptical of the existence of the paranormal in the world, is forced to investigate an old mining town for the purpose of proving or disproving paranormal activity. Along with her, she is accompanied by her younger sister Diana Whisper, who lends Angela her van, and a few other students. They journey to the town and go through some ancient salt mines. Aware of the danger provided by tampering with the grounds, through the legend of the sadistic Dr. Matarga, they still open a portal to the after life with disastrous consequences. Along the way they each take a journey to the sides of each of them.

Cast

See also 
 List of Spanish films of 2011

References

External links 
 
 

2011 films
Spanish horror films
Spanish 3D films
2011 horror films
Spanish slasher films
Rodar y Rodar films
Atresmedia Cine films
2010s Spanish films
2010s Spanish-language films